James Andrew Donaldson (born 27 August 1943) is a former English cricketer.  Donaldson was a left-handed batsman.  He was born in Castle Rising, Norfolk.

Donaldson made his debut for Norfolk in the 1963 Minor Counties Championship against Cambridgeshire.  Donaldson played Minor counties cricket for Norfolk from 1963 to 1971, which included 28 Minor Counties Championship appearances.  He made his List A debut against Cheshire in the 1968 Gillette Cup.  Opening the batting, he was dismissed for 16 runs by Anthony Shillinglaw.  He made a further List A appearance against Yorkshire in the 1969 Gillette Cup.  Opening the batting alongside Graham Saville, he scored 8 runs before being dismissed by Tony Nicholson.

References

External links
James Donaldson at ESPNcricinfo
James Donaldson at CricketArchive

1943 births
Living people
People from Castle Rising
English cricketers
Norfolk cricketers
Sportspeople from Norfolk